Angelov Island is a rocky island in the Larsen Islands group on the west side of Coronation Island in the South Orkney Islands, Antarctica. It is named after Captain Kosyo Angelov (1948-2005), commander of the ocean fishing trawler Argonavt of the Bulgarian company Ocean Fisheries – Burgas during its fishing trip to Antarctic waters off South Georgia and the South Orkney Islands from December 1978 to July 1979. Apart from trawling, the ship carried an onboard scientific team which undertook fisheries research. The Bulgarian fishermen, along with those of the Soviet Union, Poland and East Germany, are pioneers of modern Antarctic fishing industry.

Location
British mapping in 1963.

Maps
 British Antarctic Territory: South Orkney Islands. Scale 1:100000 topographic map. DOS Series 510. Surrey, England: Directorate of Overseas Surveys, 1963
 Antarctic Digital Database (ADD). Scale 1:250000 topographic map of Antarctica. Scientific Committee on Antarctic Research (SCAR). Since 1993, regularly upgraded and updated

Notes

References
 Angelov Island. SCAR Composite Gazetteer of Antarctica

External links
 Angelov Island. Adjusted Copernix satellite image

 

Islands of the South Orkney Islands
Ocean Fisheries – Burgas Co
Bulgaria and the Antarctic